Pacorus II (also spelled Pakoros II) was the King of Kings of the Parthian Empire from 78 to 110. He was the son and successor of Vologases I.

During the latter part of his father's reign, Pacorus ruled the Parthian Empire along with him. After Vologases I's death in 78, Pacorus became the sole ruler, but was quickly met by a revolt by his brother Vologases II, which lasted until the latter's defeat in 80. In 79/80, Pacorus' rule was contended by another Parthian prince—Artabanus III—whom he had defeated by 81. A third Parthian contender, Osroes I, appeared in 109. The following year, Pacorus was succeeded by his son Vologases III, who continued his father's struggle with Osroes I over the Parthian crown.

Like his father, Pacorus continued the same policies of the prominent former Parthian king Artabanus II, which included increasing the economic sources of the Parthian Empire by establishing a new trade system and strengthening relations with other powers, such as Han China. Parthian interest also continued to grow in eastern lands of Khwarazm, Bactria, and the Hindu Kush. The influence of the Parthians is demonstrated by the existence of their aspects in the coinage of numerous political entities in those areas.

Under Pacorus, the usage of the image of the Greek goddess Tyche on the reverse of Parthian coins became more regular than that of the seated king with a bow, specifically on the coin minted at Ecbatana. Tyche was either a representation of the Iranian goddesses Anahita or Ashi.

Name 
The name  is the Latin form of the Greek Pakoros, itself a variant of the Middle Iranian Pakur, derived from Old Iranian bag-puhr ('son of a god'). The Armenian and Georgian transliteration is Bakur (respectively; Բակուր, ბაკური).

Pacorus II's name is recorded in the bilingual inscription on the famous bronze statue of Heracles in Seleucia as Greek Pakhorou (genitive) and Parthian pkwr ( 'Pakur').

Background 
Under Vologases I, the empire experienced a resurgence. During the last years of his reign, Pacorus ruled alongside him. After Vologases I's death in 78, Pacorus became the sole ruler of the empire.

Reign 
Pacorus was soon met by a revolt by his brother Vologases II, which lasted until the latter's defeat in 80. In 79/80, Pacorus' rule was contended by another Parthian prince—Artabanus III, who seemed to have little support in the empire, with the exception of Babylonia. Artabanus III's most notable action was to give refuge to a Pseudo-Nero named Terentius Maximus. Artabanus III initially agreed to lend military aid to Terentius Maximus to capture Rome, until he found about the real identity of the impostor. Coin mints of Artabanus III disappear after 81, which suggests that by this year Pacorus had defeated him. 

Like his father, Pacorus sought to accomplish the goal of Artabanus II, by attempting to establish a long and structured trade-route that spanned through East Asia, India and the coast of the Mediterranean Sea. This planned long trade-route would greatly improve the economy of the Parthian Empire. In order to accomplish this, Pacorus strengthened relations with other powers whom he was able to establish long distance trade with, most notably Han China. In 97, the Chinese general Ban Chao, the Protector-General of the Western Regions, sent his emissary Gan Ying on a diplomatic mission to reach the Roman Empire. Gan visited the court of Pacorus at Hecatompylos before departing towards Rome. He traveled as far west as the Persian Gulf, where the Parthian authorities convinced him that an arduous sea voyage around the Arabian Peninsula was the only means to reach Rome. Discouraged by this, Gan Ying returned to the Han court and provided Emperor He of Han with a detailed report on the Roman Empire based on oral accounts of his Parthian hosts. The modern historian William Watson speculated that the Parthians would have been relieved at the failed efforts by the Han Empire to open diplomatic relations with Rome, especially after Ban Chao's military victories against the Xiongnu in eastern Central Asia.

Parthian interest also continued to grow in eastern lands of Khwarazm, Bactria, and the Hindu Kush. The influence of the Parthian Empire is demonstrated by the existence of Parthian aspects in the coinage of numerous political entities in those areas. During his last years of rule, Pacorus co-ruled with his son Vologases III. In 109, a third Parthian contender named Osroes I appeared. In 110, Pacorus sold the Arsacid vassal kingdom of Osroene to Abgar VII. Pacorus died in the same year, and was succeeded by Vologases III, who continued his father's struggle with Osroes I over the Arsacid crown.

Coinage 

On the observe of his coins, Pacorus is portrayed simply wearing a diadem. At first, he appeared beardless on his coins, a rare feature in Parthian coinage that demonstrated his youth, having ascended the throne around the age of sixteen or seventeen. From 82/3, he is depicted with a beard. From 93–96, Pacorus is portrayed with his father's tiara. The modern historian Marek Jan Olbrycht surmises that the wearing of the tiara in the latter part of his reign was reflected the power and status of his empire at this time. 

The reverse of his coins portrayed the Greek goddess Tyche investing him as king. Under Pacorus, the usage of the image of Tyche on the reverse of Parthian coins became more regular than that of the seated king with a bow, specifically on the coin minted at Ecbatana. This lasted until the reign of his son and successor, Vologases III. In the Parthian era, Iranians used Hellenistic iconography to portray their divine figures, thus the investiture scene can be associated with the Avestan khvarenah, i.e., kingly glory, with Tyche representing one of the Iranian goddesses Anahita or Ashi.

Offspring 
Besides Vologases III, Pacorus had three other sons: Axidares, and Parthamasiris, who successively served as kings of Armenia, and Meredates, who served as king of Characene in the mid-2nd century.

References

Sources
  
 
 
 
 
 
  
 
 
  
  (2 volumes)

Further reading 
  
 
 
 
  
 
 

110 deaths
Rulers of Media Atropatene
1st-century Parthian monarchs
2nd-century Parthian monarchs
1st-century births
1st-century Iranian people
2nd-century Iranian people
1st-century Babylonian kings
2nd-century Babylonian kings